Khalanga is the Headquarters of the Jajarkot District located in Karnali province of Nepal. Formerly it was a village development committee which incorporated to Bheri Municipality in 2015 when a new municipality was established.

At the time of the 1991 Nepal census it had a population of 8140 living in 1533 individual households.

Media 
To Promote local culture Khalanga has two Community radio Station. One is Radio Hamro Paila FM - 87.9 MHz and another is Radio Khalanga F.M - 107.6 MHz.

See also 
Jhakrithan, nearby religious site

References

External links

UN map of the municipalities of Jajarkot District

Populated places in Jajarkot District